MexZombies is a 2022 Mexican thriller comedy horror film directed by Chava Cartas and written by Luis Gamboa & Santiago Limón. Starring Iñaki Godoy, Marcelo Barceló, Roberta Damián, Luciana Vale, Vincent Webb, Daniel Tovar and Bárbara de Regil. It was commercially released on October 26, 2022 on Vix+.

Synopsis 
A group of teenagers who, little by little, have been making their way through life. Together they have organized the most popular party of their generation to celebrate the Day of the Dead, but between costumes, loud music and children asking for candy, no one has realized that the zombie apocalypse has arisen in their private house. Some believe that these beings are part of the party itself, but when things get out of control, the group will have to unite in a series of unexpected and dangerous adventures. Will they have what it takes to take down the brain lovers?

Cast 
The actors participating in this film are:

 Iñaki Godoy as Tavo
 Marcelo Barceló as Cronos
 Roberta Damián as Ana
 Luciana Vale as Rex
 Vicent Webb as Johnny
 Alejandro Puente as Deivid
 Daniel Tovar as Lalo
 Diego Jáuregui as Don Segis
 Bárbara de Regil as Chief Vargas

Production 
Principal photography of the film began on July 4, 2019 in Durango, filming lasted approximately 6 to 8 weeks.

Release 
A theatrical release was scheduled for the second half of 2020, but due to the COVID-19 pandemic it was cancelled. Subsequently, MexZombies was released on October 26, 2022 on Vix+. Prior to its official premiere, it was screened at various film festivals in October 2022, such as the Brussels International Fantastic Film Festival or the Toronto After Dark Film Festival.

References

External links 

 

2022 films
2022 comedy horror films
2022 thriller films
Mexican comedy horror films
Mexican thriller films
2020s Spanish-language films
2020s Mexican films
Films shot in Mexico
Films set in Mexico
Films about zombies
Films about teenagers
Vix (streaming service) original films